The Visakhapatnam-class destroyers, also classified as the P-15 Bravo class, or simply P-15B, is a class of guided-missile destroyers currently being built for the Indian Navy (IN).

Designed by the Warship Design Bureau (WDB), a total of four ships are being built by Mazagon Dock Limited (MDL), under the Make in India initiative. The first vessel of the class,  was commissioned on 21 November 2021. The IN plans to have all four destroyers in active service by 2024.

Design

Development
The destroyers were designed by the Warship Design Bureau (formerly the Directorate of Naval Design), a branch of the IN responsible for designing the service's warships, several among them including the s - India's first indigenously-designed nuclear-powered ballistic missile submarines,  - India's first indigenously-designed aircraft carrier, and the s.

The goal of the project was to develop a line of destroyers that were comparable to the Kolkata-class destroyers, with only several, yet incremental alterations - in order to minimize its development time and associated costs.

The design plans of the four vessels were completed by the WDB in mid-2013.

Comparison to the Kolkata-class destroyers
The P-15B is a derivative of the Kolkata-class destroyers (P-15A), a class of three stealth guided-missile destroyers, which currently serve as the IN's frontline destroyers; both classes feature several differences, with regard to their respective designs :-

 Observed as one of the most distinctive features, the P-15B and the P-15A feature different bridge layouts; the P-15B's bridge was designed to minimize the vessel's radar cross-section (RCS) and enhance resilience.
 Unlike the P-15A, the P-15B features a "rail-less" helicopter traversing system meant for securing the vessel's helicopter, in the event of adverse weather conditions.
 Contrary to the P-15A destroyers - which features its sonar equipment at the hull, the P-15B vessels features its sonar equipment at the bow.
 The P-15B features a network-centric layout, equipped with a Ship Data Network (SDN), an Automatic Power Management System (APMS), as well as a Combat Management System (CMS).

Features
The destroyers are equipped with a "Total Atmosphere Control System" (TAC), which allows them to operate in regions of nuclear fallout. Additionally, the destroyers are also equipped with nuclear, biological and chemical warfare (NBC) protective equipment, with its entire requirement of air being filtered through NBC filters.
An estimated 72% of the destroyers' components are indigenously sourced, as compared to 59% for the Kolkata-class destroyers and 42% for the s.
The destroyers feature multiple fire zones, battle damage control systems and distributional power systems for improved survivability and reliability in emergent conditions.
The destroyers feature ergonomically-designed accommodations based on modular concepts, which ensures a significant amount of crew comfort.

Naming
In accordance with naval traditions, the P-15B destroyers were christened after major Indian cities with historical and cultural connections, namely, Visakhapatnam, Mormugao, Imphal and Surat - representing the Indian states of Andhra Pradesh, Goa, Manipur and Gujarat. Notably, INS Imphal and INS Mormugao were the first two destroyers to be christened as namesakes of important cities from the regions of Northeastern India and Goa, respectively.

Instrumentation

Armament
Anti-surface warfare
For its anti-surface warfare (ASuW) capabilities, the class features sixteen Brahmos anti-ship cruise missiles, capable of speeds of up to Mach 3. The BrahMos is widely regarded as one of the most formidable anti-ship missiles currently in service, given the missile's extreme versatility and maneuverability.

Additionally, the vessels of the class are equipped with one OTO Melara 76 mm naval gun. Originally, the IN had planned to install the Mk-45  naval gun, manufactured by BAE; however, this plan was scrapped in 2021, on account of financial constraints.

Anti-air warfare
As part of its anti-air warfare (AAW) capabilities, the class features thirty-two Barak 8ER surface-to-air missiles, with sixteen missiles present in four "2 x 4" VLS configurations - with two placed at the bow and two placed aft.

For point defense, the vessels are equipped with four AK-630M close-in weapon systems (CIWS), with two systems on either side of the superstructure.

Anti-submarine warfare
For its anti-submarine warfare (ASW) capabilities, the class features two twin torpedo launchers, designed to launch heavyweight torpedoes - such as the Varunastra heavyweight torpedo, developed by the Defence Research and Development Organization (DRDO).

Aviation facilities
As part of its aviation facilities, the class is equipped with a flight deck and an enclosed aviation hangar, capable of two medium-sized helicopters – primarily the HAL Dhruv, or the Westland Sea King Mk. 42B. Additionally, the ships are equipped with a "rail-less" helicopter traversing system, meant for securing the helicopter in case of adverse weather conditions at sea.

Decoys
As for the class' defensive abilities, each destroyer is equipped with two Kavach anti-missile decoy systems for neutralizing incoming aerial threats at short ranges.

Sensors

Radar  
The class features the IAI EL/M-2248 MF-STAR S band active electronically scanned array radar, as its primary radar suite.

The class further features the Thales LW-08 (BEL RAWL-02) as its secondary radar suite. The LW-08 is a solid-state, two-dimensional, long-range D band surveillance radar, meant for providing target acquisition against aerial and surface threats.

Sonar
The class is equipped with the BEL HUMSA-NG sonar, a hull-mounted "active cum passive" integrated sonar system developed by the DRDO. The HUMSA-NG is capable of detecting, classifying and tracking sub-surface targets in both active and passive modes, with the capability to simultaneously track up to eight targets. The destroyers are also equipped with the BEL Nagin active towed array sonar.

Electronic warfare
For electronic warfare (EW), the destroyers are equipped with the DRDL Shakthi EW suite, designed to provide Indian warships an electronic layer of defense against modern radars and anti-ship missiles. Shakthi is equipped with wideband electronic support measures (ESM) and electronic countermeasures (ECM), meant for intercepting, classifying and jamming both conventional and modern radars. Additionally, the suite is also equipped with an in-build radar fingerprinting and data recording replay feature for post-mission analysis and evaluation.

History

Background
In March 2009, the Defence Acquisition Council (DAC), the arms-procurement wing of India's Ministry of Defence, approved the procurement of four 6,800 t destroyers, to be built by Mazagon Dock Shipbuilders (MDL).

Designed as a "follow-on" project to the Kolkata-class destroyers, the new destroyers were envisaged to feature only incremental changes to the former, in order to minimize developmental time and costs. At the time of the project's approval, the four new destroyers were envisaged to be more cheaper than other destroyer classes being built at the time, namely, the s, the Daring-class destroyers and the s.

No competitive bidding was conducted for the development of the vessels, since MDL was the only Indian shipyard at the time with the capability to build destroyers.

The contract for the construction of the four warships was signed on 28 January 2011, at an estimated cost of INR ₹29,643.74 crore.

Construction

The keel of the first vessel, INS Visakhapatnam, was laid by MDL in October 2013 and the ship was launched on 20 April 2015, in a ceremony attended by then-Indian naval chief Robin K. Dhowan. Originally slated to enter service in 2018, the delivery of the vessel was delayed by three years, owing to delays in the supply of the vessel's sensors and ordnance.

In July 2019, a minor fire broke aboard the unfinished-Visakhapatnam, leaving one contract worker dead and another two injured. Irrespectively, the fire was noted to have not caused any hindrance to the vessel's construction schedule; the shipyard's construction activities subsequently resumed without delay.

Visakhapatnam completed its basin trials in December 2020 and subsequently proceeded for its sea trials in 2021. Initially scheduled to be delivered in April 2021, the vessel was delivered on October 28, owing to delays caused by the COVID-19 pandemic.On 21 November 2021, Visakhapatnam was commissioned into the IN.

The second vessel of the class, Mormugao, was laid in June 2015, before being launched in September 2016. Completing its basin trials in early-December 2021, the destroyer proceed on its maiden sea sortie on 19 December, coinciding with the 60th anniversary of Goa Liberation Day. Mormugao was delivered to the IN almost a year later, on 24 November 2022 and was commissioned on 18 December 2022.

Construction of the third vessel, INS Imphal, began with the laying of its keel in May 2017; the hull was later launched on 20 April 2019, in a ceremony attended by then-Indian naval chief Sunil Lanba. As of November 2021, Imphal is reported to be in the stages of outfitting, and is likely scheduled to be commissioned in 2023.

Surat is scheduled to be commissioned in 2024.

Operational history
On 11 January 2022, only two months after its commissioning, Visakhapatnam successfully test-fired an upgraded variant of the BrahMos anti-ship missile, which was subsequently followed by another successful test-fire on 18 February. The destroyer later took part in the 12th edition of the IN's "Presidential Fleet Review" on 21 February 2022, an event which was attended by Indian president Ram Nath Kovind and Indian naval chief R. Hari Kumar.

Ships in the class

Gallery

See also

Other references to the Indian Navy
 Future of the Indian Navy
 List of destroyers of India
 List of active Indian Navy ships

Other destroyers of comparable configurations and capabilities
 Type 052D destroyer – a class of guided-missile destroyers being built for and currently operated by the People's Liberation Army Navy.
  – a class of two guided-missile destroyers operated by the Japan Maritime Self-Defense Force.

References

External links

 Kolkata-class destroyer – Bharat Rakshak
 Aegis Vessels of the World – Kolkata-class – details on the specifications of the ship and recent images of INS Kolkata at sea.

 
Destroyer classes
Destroyers of the Indian Navy
Ships built in India